Go Mode is the only extended play (EP) by American rapper Snootie Wild. It was released on September 23, 2014 by Collective Music Group and Epic Records. It was supported by the two singles "Yayo" and "Made Me", the latter of which became his first Hot 100 entry. The EP features guest appearances from Yo Gotti, Starlito, K Camp, August Alsina and Zed Zilla. Rolling Stone ranked it at number 35 on the 40 Best Albums of 2014.

Commercial performance 
Go Mode debuted at number 119 on the Billboard 200.

Track listing

Charts

References

External links 
 

2014 debut EPs
Snootie Wild albums
Epic Records EPs